The 2020–21 season was the 101st season of Swansea City in the English football league system and third consecutive season in the Championship. They also competed in the FA Cup and EFL Cup.

Club

First-team staff

First-team squad

Transfers

Transfers in

Loans in

Transfers out

Loans out

New contracts

Pre-season and friendlies

Competitions

Overview

Assists

Disciplinary record

Notes

References

External links

Swansea City A.F.C. seasons
Swansea City
Swansea City